Percept Picture Company is an Indian film production company, established in 2002 and a division of Percept Limited, an entertainment, media and communications company  based in Mumbai. It has produced films like Dhol, MP3: Mera Pehla Pehla Pyaar, Malamaal Weekly, Hanuman, Yahaan, and Pyaar Mein Twist.

In 2007, it joined hands with Music giant T-Series to co-produce a minimum of 5 films in the year 2007–2008. In Feb 2009, company's COO Navin Shah, announced its plans to invest Rs 100 crore in a new movie production banner christened 'Percept Horrotainment'.

Filmography
 Pyaar Mein Kabhi Kabhi (1999)
 Phir Milenge (2004)
 Yahaan (2005)
 Pyaar Mein Twist (2005)
 Hanuman (2005)
 Home Delivery: Aapko... Ghar Tak (2005)
 Malamaal Weekly (2006)
 Sacred Evil – A True Story (2006)
 Dor (2006)
 Traffic Signal (2007)
 MP3: Mera Pehla Pehla Pyaar (2007)
 Dhol (2007)
 Return of Hanuman (2007)
 Jannat (2008)
 Khuda Kay Liye (2008) (Indian distribution only)
 Ugly Aur Pagli (2008)
 Ru Ba Ru (2008)
 Ramchand Pakistani (2008)
 Hello (2008)
 Jumbo (2008)
 Kanchivaram (2009)
 Firaaq (2009)
 8 x 10 Tasveer (2009)
 Jail (2009)
 Raat Gayi, Baat Gayi? (2009)
 Bumm Bumm Bole (2010)
 Aashayein (2010)
 Allah Ke Banday (2010)
 Kamaal Dhamaal Malamaal (2012)
 Rush (2012)
 Bhopal: A Prayer for Rain (2014)
 Sabki Bajegi Band (2015)
 Sunshine Music Tours and Travels (2016)
 Hanuman: Da' Damdaar (2017)
 Akka Kuruvi (2022)

References

External links
 Percept Picture Company, Official website
 Percept Entertainment and Media Company, Official website
 Percept Pictures, website
 Percept Picture Company at Internet Movie Database.

Film distributors of India
Indian companies established in 2002
Film production companies based in Mumbai
Producers who won the Best Feature Film National Film Award
2002 establishments in Maharashtra